Dakota North may refer to:

 Dakota North (comics), a fictional character in the Marvel Comics universe
 Dakota North (speedway rider), Australian motorcycle speedway rider

See also
 North Dakota (disambiguation)